Kokila Pawan Jayasuriya (born 1 November 1994), is an actor in  Sri Lankan cinema, theatre and television. He is very popular as a child artist for the role "Sirimal" in the film Siri Raja Siri and role "Manamaalan" in the television serial Nadgamkarayo.

Personal life 
Kokila was born on 1 November in Piliyandala, Sri Lanka, as the eldest and his younger brother Dilshan Sathsara Sawan is also an actor. He studied at Piliyandala Central College. In 2020, he married his long time partner, Nimali Dilshani Fernando.

Career 
He approached the stage through Sri Shobitha Dhampasela and school, his drama teacher, ' Kokilani ' recognised his skills and encouraged him to take part in the children's program Hapan Padura. He applied, got through the interview and was a member of the team. He started his career as a stage actor in stage dramas conducted by Jayalath Manoratne at the age of twelve, where he was selected for the role of Sethu in the stage drama Thala Mala Pipila, produced by Manoratne. He also performed in Monratne's play Makara. Then he performed in the play Punchi Punchi Petiyo, produced by Bandula Kuruwitarachchi, for which Jayasuriya won first place in the State Drama Festival in 2005.

In 2007, he received a chance to act in the film Siri Raja Siri, directed by Somaratne Dissanayake. After critics acclaimed his performance in the film, he was chosen to act in Aba, directed by Jackson Anthony, where he portrayed Aba as a child.

As a child artist, he acted in the mega serial Malee. In 2021, he appeared in the television serial Nadagamkarayo broadcast on Swarnawahini TV. His role as Malan in the serial became highly popular where the series eventually became trending in the YouTube. Meanwhile he also nominated for the Best Actor of the year at Sumathi Awards and reached Top 5 of the category. Apart from that, he also acted in the teledramas such as Aaliya, Sidu, Dangale, and Sihina Samagama.  

Jayasuriya is also a singer who started career with Hapan Padura. He is also a dubbing artist and a chef.

Selected television serials 
 Aaliya 
 Dangale
 Daam
 Malee
 Nadagamkarayo
 Ralla Veralata Adarei
 Sidu
 Shakthi (Sidu 2)
 Sihina Samagama

Filmography

References

External links 

 
 මනමාලනුයි – කවඩියයි ඇවිත් නටපු නාඩගම් | Kokila Pawan Jayasooriya & Sangeeth Prabhu | Music Pickle
 Ma Nowana Mama | With Kokila Pawan Jayasooriya ( 09.07.2021 )
 අපි හිතුවා නාඩගම්කාරයො නවත්තන්න වෙයි කියලා – මනමාලං (කෝකිල පවන්|Kokila Pawan) |Nathasha Perera Show

1994 births
Living people
Sri Lankan male television actors
Sri Lankan male film actors
Sri Lankan male stage actors